The surname Fjelde may refer to:

Paul Fjelde (1892–1984), American sculptor and educator
Pål Fjelde (born 1994), Norwegian footballer
Jacob Fjelde (1855–1896), Norwegian born American sculptor
Pauline Fjelde (1861–1923), Norwegian born American painter, embroiderer, and textile artist
Rolf G. Fjelde (1926–2002), American playwright, educator and poet

Norwegian-language surnames